Rummel T is the informal name of Archbishop Rummel Transition School.  After Hurricane Katrina, the Archdiocese of New Orleans realized the need for a temporary school for displaced students from Catholic high schools in the devastated New Orleans area. Archbishop Rummel High School in Metairie, LA, volunteered to take on the monumental task of accepting 1300 more students to their campus. Rummel set up a platooning schedule, with traditional Rummel Students going from 6:30 to 12:30 every morning and Transition students going from 1:30 to 6:00 PM. Thus Archbishop Rummel Transition School (ARTS or Rummel T) was born. The school featured students from various Catholic schools along the Gulf Coast, including St. Stanislaus in Bay St. Louis, MS. A majority of the students were from Mount Carmel Academy, Dominican High School, Brother Martin High School, and Ursuline Academy.

Academics
Rummel T used a rotating schedule with three periods a day, eighty minutes each. Students took six classes, and the rotation was Day A (Periods 1,2,3) and Day B (Periods 4,5,6). Student's schedules were geared towards making the transition back to their home schools as easily as possible. Honors courses were available; however, no AP classes were scheduled, much to the dismay of AP students.

Athletics
Rummel T fielded several girls athletic teams, including volleyball, basketball, swimming, and cross country. The "Lady Raiders" advanced to third in the Division I state playoffs in volleyball, 4th in State in cross country, and 6th in State in swimming.

Extracurriculars
Rummel T also fielded an Academic Games squad. The day school also opened many of its activities to the Transition school; most notable was the campus ministry nights once a month. Also, a dance committee was formed to organize the "Homegoing Dance." The committee hosted bakesales and even a day of Christmas Caroling to help fund the dance, which featured two local bands.

Announcements
A signature element of Rummel T was the afternoon announcements held at the beginning and end of each day. The day started with a traditional Rummel prayer that includes the tagline "Thank God Almighty I'm A Raider." This became a running joke with the Transition students and even made it on one of the two Rummel T t-shirt designs. Every so often, "Mr. Gabe" would be joined by students making fools of themselves on the announcements, or Mr. Gabriel would poke fun at his fellow administrators.

On one memorable occasion, an administrator scolded the ladies for not wearing their uniform socks appropriately, stating that their visible ankles were distracting the male students. Of note, this co-ed high school experience was new to most students, who otherwise attended single-sex schools.

Media coverage
Rummel T constantly made the news, as local news crews made exposé after exposé on life after Katrina, and the Archdiocese used the school to hold many of its press conferences. Louisiana governor (then a U.S. Representative) Bobby Jindal even paid a visit to the school to speak with the students.

External links
Web page for the Rummel Raiders.

Hurricane Katrina disaster relief
Archbishop Rummel Transition School
Archbishop Rummel Transition School